In mathematics, and in particular the necklace splitting problem, the Hobby–Rice theorem is a result that is useful in establishing the existence of certain solutions.  It was proved in 1965 by Charles R. Hobby and John R. Rice; a simplified proof was given in 1976 by A. Pinkus.

The theorem
Given an integer n, define a partition of the interval [0,1] as a sequence of numbers which divide the interval to  subintervals:

 

Define a signed partition as a partition in which each subinterval  has an associated sign :

 

The Hobby-Rice theorem says that for every n continuously integrable functions:

 

there exists a signed partition of [0,1] such that:

 

(in other words: for each of the n functions, its integral over the positive subintervals equals its integral over the negative subintervals).

Application to fair division
The theorem was used by Noga Alon in the context of necklace splitting in 1987.

Suppose the interval [0,1] is a cake. There are n partners and each of the n functions is a value-density function of one partner. We want to divide the cake into two parts such that all partners agree that the parts have the same value. This fair-division challenge is sometimes referred to as the consensus-halving problem. The Hobby-Rice theorem implies that this can be done with n cuts.

References

Theorems in measure theory
Fair division
Combinatorics on words
Theorems in analysis